Henry Baines may refer to:
Henry Baines (bishop) (1905–1972), English bishop
Henry Baines (botanist) (1793–1878), English botanist